This is a list of the States of India ranked in order of percentage of children 
delivered in hospital. This information was gathered from National Family Health Survey of 2015–16. Kerala has the highest institutional delivery percentage 99.8% and Nagaland has the lowest in 32.8%.

List

References

Health in India by state or union  territory